Anoeta is a railway station in San Sebastián, Basque Country, Spain. It is owned by Euskal Trenbide Sarea and operated by Euskotren. It lies on the San Sebastián-Hendaye railway, popularly known as the Topo line. It primarily serves the nearby Anoeta Stadium.

History 
The station wasn't part of the line when it opened in 1912. The area was the site of a level crossing with a high traffic level, so the decision was taken to build a tunnel for the railway. The station opened together with the tunnel in 1993.

Due to overcrowding on match days, a second vestibule will be built, with works expected to start in late 2022. It will open in 2025.

Services 
The station is served by Euskotren Trena lines E2 and E5. Line E2 runs every 15 minutes during weekdays and weekend afternoons, and every 30 minutes on weekend mornings. Line E5 serves the  branch, running every 15 minutes on weekdays and weekend afternoons, and every 30 minutes on weekend mornings.

References

External links
 

Euskotren Trena stations
Railway stations in San Sebastián
Railway stations in Spain opened in 1993
1993 establishments in the Basque Country (autonomous community)